The 1981 All-Ireland Minor Football Championship was the 50th staging of the All-Ireland Minor Football Championship, the Gaelic Athletic Association's premier inter-county Gaelic football tournament for boys under the age of 18.

Kerry entered the championship as defending champions, however, they were defeated by Cork in the Munster final.

On 20 September 1981, Cork won the championship following a 4-9 to 2-7 defeat of Derry in the All-Ireland final. This was their seventh All-Ireland title overall and their first in seven championship seasons.

Results

Connacht Minor Football Championship

Quarter-Final

Semi-Finals

Final

Munster Minor Football Championship

Quarter-Finals

Semi-Finals

Final

Ulster Minor Football Championship

Preliminary Round

Quarter-Finals

Semi-Finals

Final

Leinster Minor Football Championship

Preliminary Round

Quarter-Finals

Semi-Finals

Final

All-Ireland Minor Football Championship

Semi-Finals

Final

References

1981
All-Ireland Minor Football Championship